Relax Edition 3 is the eighth studio album by Trance duo Blank & Jones. It was released in 2007.

Track listing
CD1 - Sun
"Roots" - 3:17
"Nothing Can Come Between Us" - 3:50 (Sade cover, vocals by Mike Francis)
"City Lights" - 4:12 (William Pitt cover, vocals by Mike Francis)
"Die Blaue Stunde" - 4:39
"Perfect Love" - 4:03
"The Palms" - 2:50
"Summer Breeze" - 4:19 (Seals and Crofts cover, vocals by Mike Francis)
"Florent 2 A.M." - 3:47
"That Loving Feeling" - 5:45 (Tony Joe White cover, vocals by Mike Francis)
"California Sunrise" - 4:06
"Friends" - 4:53
"Down" - 4:10 (Labi Siffre cover, vocals by Mike Francis)

CD2 - Moon  	  
"Time (Beach House Mix)" - 7:02 (Culture Club cover, vocals by Mike Francis)
"Still The Same (Club Rome Mix)" - 6:34 (Bob Seger & The Silver Bullet Band cover, vocals by Mike Francis)
"City Lights (Late Night Dub Mix)" - 6:41 (William Pitt cover, vocals by Mike Francis)
"(The) Captain Of Her Heart (Lounge Instrumental)" - 7:04 (Double cover)
"Deliver Me (Funk Dub)" - 6:24 (Beloved cover, vocals by Mike Francis)
"Lazy" - 6:27
"Nothing Can Come Between Us (Deep Mix)" - 4:36 (Sade cover, vocals by Mike Francis)
"Josephine (Balearic House Mix)" - 6:27 (Chris Rea cover, vocals by Mike Francis)
"People From Ibiza (Bongoloverz Mix)" - 8:25 (Sandy Marton cover)

Blank & Jones albums
2007 albums